Ronald Howard Davis (born May 1, 1954) is a retired professional basketball small forward who spent three seasons in the National Basketball Association (NBA) as a member of the Atlanta Hawks (1976–77) and the San Diego Clippers (1980–82). He attended Washington State University and was drafted during the fifth round of the 1976 NBA draft by the Hawks.

Career statistics

Regular season

|-
| style="text-align:left; | 
| style="text-align:left;"| Atlanta
| 7 || – || 9.6 || .229 || .246 || .308 || 1.0 || 0.3 || 1.0 || 0.0 || 2.9
|-
| style="text-align:left" | 1978–79
| style="text-align:left;"| Anchorage (CBA)
| 48 || – || 43.8 ||.516 || .150 || .747 || 12.3 || 2.5 || 1.6 || 1.0 || style="background:#CFECEC" | 29.9*
|-
| style="text-align:left;left;background:#afe6fa;"| 1979–80†
| style="text-align:left;"| Anchorage (CBA)
| 45 || – || 38.0 || .486 || .313 || .656 || 10.9 || 2.6 || 1.4 || 1.1 || style="background:#CFECEC" | 32.0*
|-
| style="text-align:left; | 
| style="text-align:left;"| San Diego
| 64 || – || 12.8 || .443 || .250 || .595 || 1.9 || 0.7 || 0.6 || 0.2 || 5.8
|-
| style="text-align:left; | 
| style="text-align:left;"| San Diego
| 7 || – || 9.6 || .400 || – || .500 || 1.9 || 0.6 || 0.0 || 0.0 || 3.3
|-
| style="text-align:left;"|1981–82
| style="text-align:left;"| Anchorage (CBA)
| 31 || – || 41.8 || .539 || .353 || .653 || 10.1 || 3.5 || 1.7 || 0.9 || style="background:#EOCEF2" | 35.1
|-
| style="text-align:left;"|1982–83
| style="text-align:left;"| Billings (CBA)
| 31 || – || 43.3 || .552 || .318 || .652 || 11.6 || 3.4 || 1.2 || 0.9 || style="background:#CFECEC" | 30.3*
|-
|- class="sortbottom"
| style="text-align:center;" colspan=2| Career
| 229 || – || 28.4 || .452 || .198 || .587 || 7.1 || 1.9 || 1.1 || 0.6 || 19.9

Playoffs

|-
| style="text-align:left" | 1979
| style="text-align:left;"| Anchorage (CBA)
| 8 || – || 43.1 ||.621 || .333 || .761 || 15.4 || 3.5 || 2.0 || 1.0 || 41.4
|-
| style="text-align:left;left;background:#afe6fa;"| 1980†
| style="text-align:left;"| Anchorage (CBA)
| 12 || – || 46.3 || .464 || .194 || .691 || 10.6 || 2.5 || 1.7 || 0.8 || 27.8
|-
|- class="sortbottom"
| style="text-align:center;" colspan=2| Career
| 20 || – || 45.0 || .532 || .216 || .724 || 12.5 || 2.9 || 1.8 || 0.9 || 33.2

External links

 Ron Davis Statistics on StatsCrew.com

1954 births
Living people
Anchorage Northern Knights players
Atlanta Hawks draft picks
Atlanta Hawks players
Basketball players from Phoenix, Arizona
American men's basketball players
Junior college men's basketball players in the United States
San Diego Clippers players
Small forwards
Washington State Cougars men's basketball players
American expatriate basketball people in the Philippines
Barangay Ginebra San Miguel players
Philippine Basketball Association imports